Luther King Kwame Adinkra, popularly called Kwame Adinkra or Apotiti Mati, is a Ghanaian broadcast journalist, singer, philanthropist and a public speaker. He was formally the host and Chief Operating Officer manager for Angel Broadcasting Network. He is currently the Morning Show Host on Pure FM.

Education 
He holds a Master of Philosophy in Communication design from Kwame Nkrumah University of Science and Technology  and a Bachelor of Arts Degree in Graphic design from Kwame Nkrumah University of Science and Technology.

Life and career 
He was the host of the morning show on Angel fm and moved to Abusua fm. He is currently the host of Morning show on Pure Fm. He is in the position of a business manager at the Kumasi-based Pure FM.

He respects tradition and culture and has a firm root at the Manhyia Palace. He is a  serving member of the Five-member planning committee formed  by His Royal Majesty Otumfuo Osei Tutu II (King of Asante) to work on the modalities of Otumfuo Charity Foundation Teachers Award.

He has featured as a prominent judge on reality shows on TV such as TV3 Mentor, Ghana's Most Beautiful and the maiden edition of Coca-Cola Hit Single. He was the chairman of the entertainment committee of the Kumasi Venue Organizing Committee of CAN 2008. His team of producers includes Eunice Akoto Attakora-Manu, Evans Osei-Bonsu and Kwame Tanko will as head of his production team.

Controversy 
Kwame was suspended by the EIB Media Network for his failure to appear on his morning show program, Abusua Nkomo on Kumasi-based Abusua FM. It was claimed it was due to failure in settling arrears in his salaries. It was also claim it was because of him agreeing a deal with Pure FM whilst still working as a staff of the network.

Awards 
 2015 Best Morning Show Host, Radio and Television Personality Awards (RTP).

References 

Year of birth missing (living people)
Living people
Chief operating officers
Ghanaian radio journalists
Kwame Nkrumah University of Science and Technology alumni
Ghanaian philanthropists
Alumni of Opoku Ware School
Ghanaian television journalists